Westminster Christian Academy (WCA) is a private Christian school in Town and Country, Missouri serving students in grades 7–12. As of 2022, the school has an enrollment of approximately 940 students. The Upper School (9-12) enrolls approximately 685 students and the Middle School (7-8) enrolls approximately 255 students.

History

Westminster Christian Academy opened on September 7, 1976, to 72 students. In its first two years, Westminster operated out of rented classrooms from Missouri Baptist University under the leadership of Headmaster Nolan Vander Ark. Before joining Westminster, Mr. Vander Ark served as a Christian Reformed missionary in Africa. After two years, the administration purchased a campus known as the "Des Peres School" in Kirkwood, Missouri. Once Westminster moved to the new campus, Evelyn Downs assumed the position of headmistress and remained so until 1981.

After four years at the Des Peres campus, the student body doubled and the necessity of finding space for the rapidly growing school was unavoidable. In 1982, Westminster purchased a 30-acre campus in Creve Coeur. During this time, Arlen Dykstra became headmaster and oversaw the relocation of the school. In 2000, the school completed an $11 million construction and renovation project to add a gymnasium, student commons, hallway wings, a weightlifting facility and locker rooms, a bookstore, and offices. The 2010–11 school year marked the last of its use by the school; the campus was sold to the Ladue School District for $18 million.

In 2002, Westminster purchased the campus of the West County Vocational Technical School in Town and Country with plans to renovate the space to serve for future growth of the school. Additionally, an adjacent parcel of land was purchased from Central Presbyterian Church. The purchase was made possible by a donation to Westminster by an anonymous supporter. Construction on the new campus finished in early August 2011. The current campus has made the addition of a multitude of fields for both practicing on and hosting games including 12 tennis courts, three gymnasiums, one theatre that seats more than 600 people, a black box theatre, football stadium, soccer field, practice fields, swimming pool, and many storage facilities and lockers. Each grade level also has its own common area, including meeting spaces for student organizations.

Leadership 
The school has had seven heads of school since its inception in 1970: Nolan Vander Ark (1976–77); Evelyn Downs (1977–81); Arlen Dykstra (1981–84); Larry Birchler (acting headmaster 1984–85); Jim Marsh (1985–2013); Dr. Tom Stoner (2013–2016); Barrett Mosbacker (2017–present). Tim Hall, Scott Holley and Todd Fuller served as an interim head of school team during the 2015-16 school year.

Programs

Academics 
During the 1990–91 school year, Westminster was recognized as a Blue Ribbon School by the United States Department of Education.

Arts 
The school has been recognized by the St. Louis High School Musical Theatre Awards multiple times—awards received include Outstanding Production (2017, 2019, 2020, 2022), Outstanding Ensemble (2019), Outstanding Costume Design & Execution (2018), Outstanding Direction (2018), Outstanding Supporting Actress (2017), and Outstanding Lead Actress (2022). During the 2018–19 school year, 15 students were selected to participate in the St. Louis metro district honors choir and orchestra. Two students were also selected to participate in the All-State Choir.

Athletics
Westminster is a member of the Metro League (Missouri) along with John Burroughs, Lutheran North, Lutheran South, MICDS, Principia, Priory, and Villa Duchesne.

Athletic performance 
In the past seven years, Westminster's athletics program has won ten team state championships and more than 18 individual state titles.

 The Westminster boys baseball team placed first in state in the spring of 2011, 2012, 2013, and 2014. They are the first school in Missouri history to win four straight baseball championships. In 2019, the boys' placed second in the state.
 The boys cross country team has finished third at the state meet three times (2010, 2014, 2015).
 Girls cross country has won three district championships (2001, 2017, 2018).
 The boys soccer team has won two district championships (2009, 2014) and a metro league conference championship (2009).
 Since its inception in 1997, the girls' golf team has won two state championships (201, 2012), five district championships (2006, 2010, 2011, 2012, 2015) and two conference championships (2011, 2012).
 The Wildcat softball team has won six district championships (2007, 2008, 2011, 2014, 2018, 2020).
 The girls tennis team has won one district championship (2013) and a doubles team state championship (2009).
 Westminster girls volleyball won the MSHAA class 4 state championship in 2012, 2021, and 2022, was a state runner-up in 2007, and has won 15 district championships.
 Since the inaugural varsity season in 2001, Westminster football has won five district championships (2006, 2009, 2013–15) and two conference championships (2006, 2014).
 The boys basketball team has won six district championships (2005, 2007, 2008, 2015, 2019, 2020).
 The girls basketball program has won four district championships (2007, 2011, 2012, 2020).
 Westminster hockey won consecutive Wickenheiser Cups in 2017 and 2018.
 The boys golf team has won one team state championship (2010) and eight district championships (1996, 2001, 2003, 2009, 2010, 2011, 2012, and 2013).
 The girls soccer team has won three district championships (2007, 2008, 2018).
 The boys volleyball team has won one state championship (2015).
 Margo O'Meara is the only athlete in Missouri history to win four straight state diving championships and broke the state meet diving record for highest point total ever in 2019.

Accreditation and memberships

Accreditation 
Westminster was the first Christian school to be accredited by the Independent Schools Association of the Central States (ISACS), an accreditation the school maintains to this day. The school is also accredited by Cognia.

Memberships

Westminster is a member of the following organizations: Council on Educational Standards & Accountability, Independent Schools of St. Louis, Christian Schools Association of St. Louis, and Christian Schools International.

Notable alumni

Michael Gerson, 1982, former presidential speechwriter for George W. Bush and one of Time Magazine's "25 Most Influential Evangelicals In America".
Sandra McCracken, 1995, singer-songwriter.
Jacob Turner, 2009, former MLB pitcher for the Detroit Tigers, Miami Marlins, Chicago Cubs, Chicago White Sox, and Washington Nationals.

References

External links

Westminster Christian Academy — official site

Christian schools in Missouri
High schools in St. Louis County, Missouri
Middle schools in St. Louis County, Missouri
Private schools in St. Louis County, Missouri
Nondenominational Christian schools in the United States
Educational institutions established in 1976
Private high schools in Missouri
Private middle schools in Missouri
1976 establishments in Missouri